(R)-4-hydroxyphenyllactate dehydrogenase is an enzyme that catalyzes a chemical reaction

(R)-3-(4-hydroxyphenyl)lactate + NAD(P)+  3-(4-hydroxyphenyl)pyruvate + NAD(P)H + H

The 3 substrates of this enzyme are (R)-3-(4-hydroxyphenyl)lactate, NAD, and NADP, whereas its 4 products are 3-(4-hydroxyphenyl)pyruvate, NADH, NADPH, and H.

This enzyme belongs to the family of oxidoreductases, specifically those acting on the CH-OH group of donor with NAD or NADP as acceptor. The systematic name of this enzyme class is (R)-3-(4-hydroxyphenyl)lactate:NAD(P) 2-oxidoreductase. Other names in common use include (R)-aromatic lactate dehydrogenase, and D-hydrogenase, D-aryllactate. This enzyme participates in tyrosine and phenylalanine catabolism.

References

 
 

EC 1.1.1
NADPH-dependent enzymes
NADH-dependent enzymes
Enzymes of unknown structure